Jonathan Coffer (born 8 March 1989) is a multiple Grammy-nominated songwriter and record producer from London. He has written and produced for artists including Beyoncé, Kendrick Lamar, Lykke Li, FKA twigs, Naughty Boy, Emeli Sandé, Fall Out Boy, Weezer, Rita Ora, Alicia Keys, Martin Garrix, Ellie Goulding, Bastille, Jess Glynne, Rag'n'Bone Man, Tom Odell, Gorgon City, Wretch 32, Kamal., and Miley Cyrus.

He co-wrote the UK number 1 hit "La La La" feat. Sam Smith, as well as "Runnin' (Lose It All)" with Naughty Boy. Coffer co-wrote and produced the song "Freedom" feat. Kendrick Lamar from Beyonce's 2016 album Lemonade.
  and co-wrote "Drown" feat. Clinton Kane for Martin Garrix. He also co-produced "High Hopes" with Panic! at the Disco, which reached #4 on the Billboard Hot 100.

Discography

References

English record producers
English songwriters
Living people
1989 births